Mead High School is a high school in Longmont, Colorado, United States operated by St. Vrain Valley School District.

In 2021, Mead High School reached National news after 3 students appear to reenact the murder of George Floyd. In the picture, the students captioned:

“Bye Bye Seniors 👋, lucky a** mfs.”

Shortly after the incident, the schools principal resigned. The new principal, Brain Young, was the former principal of Frederick High School. Despite the controversy, the students involved in this photo managed to obtain scholarships to the college of their choice.

References

External links

High schools in Colorado
Longmont, Colorado